France competed at the 2013 Mediterranean Games in Mersin, Turkey from 20 to 30 June 2013.

Sailing 

Men

Women

Swimming 

Men

Women

Volleyball

Men's tournament
Preliminary round

Semifinal

Bronze medal match

Women's tournament
Preliminary round

Fifth place match

Water polo

Men's tournament

Team 

Alexandre Camarasa
Arnaud Jablonski
Enzo Khasz
Jonathan Moriame
Loris Jeleff
Manuel Laversanne
Mathieu Peisson
Mehdi Marzouki
Michael Bodegas
Raphael Pirat
Remi Garsau
Remi Saudadier
Thibaut Simon

Preliminary round

Fifth place match

References

Nations at the 2013 Mediterranean Games
2013
Mediterranean Games